David Kui Kong Young (December 5, 1916 – December 29, 2012) was a Chinese boxer. Kui Kong Young was undefeated in his first 6 fights with a record of 4-0-2.

Kui Kong Young fought Jackie Wilson in two straight fight in Australia. Kui Kong Young lost both fights. The first fight he lost by DQ. The second fight he lost by decision. Kui Kong Young fought Little Dado three times. The first fight Kui Kong Young won by decision at the Honolulu Stadium. The second fight David won again by decision at the Honolulu Stadium. The third fight was for the World Bantamweight Title only recognized by the Hawaiian Territorial Boxing Commission and David won again this time by TKO at the Honolulu Stadium. Kui Kong Young defended the World Bantamweight Title against Manuel Ortiz. Ortiz won by split decision in Honolulu, Hawaii.

External links
 http://www.boxrec.com/list_bouts.php?human_id=10&cat=boxer&pageID=1
 http://www.boxrec.com/media/index.php?title=Human:10

1916 births
2012 deaths
American male boxers
American sportspeople of Chinese descent
Bantamweight boxers
Chinese male boxers
Sportspeople from Honolulu